A mohra is a necklace made of gold coins worn by the bride at a Sikh wedding. The mohra is given to the groom by the bride's father, who places it around the bride's neck after the wedding ceremony.

References

External links
 Bangles, necklaces, and garlands

Necklaces
Jewellery of India